Many scientific, state-wide public opinion polls have been conducted relating to the United States of America (U.S.) presidential election, 2008, matching up Hillary Clinton against John McCain.

One survey group concluded that Hillary Clinton lost some support because of her gender, pointing out that in "head-to-head match-ups, Clinton bests Senator John McCain 48%-43% and Obama wins by the same five-point margin, 47%-42%" but that "given a choice between all three candidates, Obama gets 35% and McCain 37%, both running well ahead of Clinton (28%)" and that "three-way results... reflect an enormous gender gap: Clinton is narrowly the top choice of women with 36%, but only 18% of men pick her first."

Map of the polling data

The lower map has been adjusted so that state size represents electoral strength. For details see here. Map and totals updated on June 3, 2008.

Opinion polling

Alabama
9 electoral votes

Alaska
3 electoral votes

Arizona
10 electoral votes

Arkansas
6 electoral votes

California
55 electoral votes

Colorado
9 electoral votes

Connecticut
7 electoral votes

Delaware
3 electoral votes

Florida
27 electoral votes

Georgia
15 electoral votes

Hawaii
4 electoral votes

Idaho
4 electoral votes

Illinois
21 electoral votes

Indiana
11 electoral votes

Iowa
7 electoral votes

Kansas
6 electoral votes

Kentucky
8 electoral votes

Louisiana
9 electoral votes

Maine
4 electoral votes

Maryland
10 electoral votes

Massachusetts
12 electoral votes

Michigan
17 electoral votes

Minnesota
10 electoral votes

Mississippi
6 electoral votes

Missouri
11 electoral votes

Montana
3 electoral votes

Nebraska
5 electoral votes

Nevada
5 electoral votes

New Hampshire
4 electoral votes

New Jersey
15 electoral votes

New Mexico
5 electoral votes

New York
31 electoral votes

North Carolina
15 electoral votes

North Dakota
3 electoral votes

Ohio
20 electoral votes

Oklahoma
7 electoral votes

Oregon
7 electoral votes

Pennsylvania
21 electoral votes

Rhode Island
4 electoral votes

South Carolina
8 electoral votes

South Dakota
3 electoral votes

Tennessee
11 electoral votes

Texas
34 electoral votes

Utah
5 electoral votes

Vermont
3 electoral votes

Virginia
13 electoral votes

Washington
11 electoral votes

West Virginia
5 electoral votes

Wisconsin
10 electoral votes

Wyoming
3 electoral votes

Latest results (using latest polling when available)
The numbers in parentheses indicate the number of electoral votes awarded to each state. A simple majority of electoral votes (270 out of 538) is needed to secure the presidency.

John McCain vs. Hillary Clinton

 President Elect: Hillary Clinton26 states and DC (324 electoral votes)
 Arkansas (6)
 California (55)§
 Connecticut (7)§
 Delaware (3)§
 D.C. (3)R§
 Florida (27)
 Hawaii (4)§
 Illinois (21)§
 Indiana (11)
 Kentucky (8)
 Maine (4)§
 Maryland (10)§
 Massachusetts (12)§
 Minnesota (10)
 Missouri (11)
 Nevada (5)
 New Hampshire (4)
 New Jersey (15)
 New Mexico (5)
 New York (31)§
 Ohio (20)
 Oregon (7)
 Pennsylvania (21)
 Rhode Island (4)§
 Vermont (3)§
 Washington (11)
 West Virginia (5)

 Second Place: John McCain23 states (198 electoral votes)
 Alabama (9)§
 Alaska (3)§
 Arizona (10)§
 Colorado (9)
 Georgia (15)§
 Idaho (4)§
 Iowa (7)
 Kansas (6)§
 Louisiana (9)§
 Mississippi (6)§
 Montana (3)§
 Nebraska (5)§
 North Carolina (15)
 North Dakota (3)§
 Oklahoma (7)§
 South Carolina§ (8)
 South Dakota (3)§
 Tennessee (11)§
 Texas (34)§
 Utah (5)§
 Virginia (13)
 Wisconsin (10)
 Wyoming (3)§

 Too close to call1 state (17 electoral votes)
 Michigan (17)

Notes:
 "R" indicates a state where the only current (2008) data is The Rasmussen Reports Balance of Power Calculator
 "§" indicates a state that is listed as a safe Republican/Democratic state by The Rasmussen Reports Balance of Power Calculator. Red color indicates a state that listed safe but is in the opposite column.

See also
 Statewide opinion polling for the United States presidential election, 2008
 Nationwide opinion polling for the Democratic Party 2008 presidential candidates
 Statewide opinion polling for the Democratic Party presidential primaries, 2008
 Nationwide opinion polling for the Republican Party 2008 presidential candidates
 Statewide opinion polling for the Republican Party presidential primaries, 2008

References

External links
 FiveThirtyEight.com: Detailed analysis of state-by-state general election polling
 Election 2008: Presidential, Senate and House Races Updated Daily
 Rasmussen Reports: Balance of Power Calculator
 Real Clear Politics
 Survey USA
 Electoral Votes

Hillary Clinton